Serge & Christine Ghisoland (both born in 1946) are a singing duo from Mouscron, Belgium, best known for their participation in the 1972 Eurovision Song Contest.

Eurovision Song Contest 
In 1970, the then unknown married couple took part in the semi-finals of the Belgian Eurovision selection with two songs, "Lai lai lai" and "Nous serons toi et moi".  Both qualified for the final, but the Ghisolands decided to withdraw "Nous serons toi et moi", leaving "Lai lai lai" to go forward, where it finished fourth.

In 1972 the couple were chosen as the Belgian representatives and performed ten songs which were the subject of a public vote.  The winner was  "À la folie ou pas du tout" ("Madly, or Not At All"), which went forward to the 17th Eurovision Song Contest, held on 25 March in Edinburgh.  "À la folie ou pas du tout" finished the evening in 17th place of 18 entries, ahead only of the Maltese song.

Later career 
There is little information available on the couple after their Eurovision appearance, although Serge Ghisoland is believed to have worked for many years with Belgian record label, Elver. He was also a music teacher in several schools in the Mouscron/Comines region of Belgium.

References 

Belgian pop music groups
Eurovision Song Contest entrants for Belgium
Eurovision Song Contest entrants of 1972
People from Mouscron